Louis Adelbert Toepfer (August 31, 1919 – March 6, 2000) was the second President of Case Western Reserve University.

Toepfer was born in Sheboygan, Wisconsin on August 31, 1919.

Toepfer earned a Bachelor of Arts, magna cum laude, from Beloit College in 1940.  He married his college sweetheart, Alice Mary Willy, in 1942.  During World War II, he served as a Second Lieutenant in the U.S. Navy from 1942-1946, primarily on the USS Healy, a destroyer in the Pacific theater.  In 1947, he graduated from Harvard Law School.  Upon graduation, Toepfer became a member of Harvard Law School's faculty, and served as the school's vice dean from 1950-1966.

In 1966, Toepfer came to Case Western Reserve University as dean of the School of Law.  He served as the second president of Case Western Reserve University from 1970-1980.  Upon retirement,  he joined the national law firm of Jones, Day, Reavis & Pogue as partner in charge of opening and managing the firm's new office in Columbus, Ohio.

External links
 Case Western Reserve University bio

References

1919 births
2000 deaths
Beloit College alumni
Case Western Reserve University faculty
Harvard Law School alumni
Harvard Law School faculty
Presidents of Case Western Reserve University
United States Navy personnel of World War II
20th-century American academics